Kenarshahr Rural District is a rural district (dehestan) in the Central District of Bardaskan County, Razavi Khorasan Province, Iran. At the 2006 census, its population was 5,065, in 1,477 families.  The rural district has 11 villages.

References 

Rural Districts of Razavi Khorasan Province
Bardaskan County
Rural Districts of Bardaskan County
Bardaskan